The Ghost site (16 TE 18), or Ghost site mounds is an archaeological site in Tensas Parish, Louisiana, with an early to middle Coles Creek culture component (700–1200 CE) and a Late Coles Creek to Plaquemine culture component (1200 to 1541 CE).

Description
The site has three surviving mounds and could have had as many as five. The mound has been used historically as a cemetery. Since 1990 considerable erosion has damaged the mound, after portions of it were removed to build a dam across a nearby bayou. Mound B was also partially removed for the dam project, but Mound C is still intact. Two other small rises still exist (Mound D and Mound E), but it is unclear if they were mounds or natural features.

Excavations
Limited archaeological testing has been done at the site. Bone, shell, ceramics, and charcoal were found underneath Mounds A and B, and based on decorative elements on the pottery they are dated 700–1200 during the Early to Middle Coles Creek period. Other examples were found in Mounds B and C that have been dated to 1200 to 1541 during the Plaquemine period.

Location
It is verges on a bayou that flows into the Tensas River.

See also
Culture, phase, and chronological table for the Mississippi Valley
Balmoral Mounds
Flowery Mound
Sundown Mounds

References

External links
 Ghost Site Mounds at megalithic.co.uk

Plaquemine Mississippian culture
Archaeological sites of the Coles Creek culture
Mounds in Louisiana
Geography of Tensas Parish, Louisiana